Cardiac imaging refers to non-invasive imaging of the heart using ultrasound, magnetic resonance imaging (MRI), computed tomography (CT), or nuclear medicine (NM) imaging with PET or SPECT. These cardiac techniques are otherwise referred to as echocardiography, Cardiac MRI, Cardiac CT, Cardiac PET and Cardiac SPECT including myocardial perfusion imaging.

Indications
A physician may recommend cardiac imaging to support a diagnosis of a heart condition.

Medical specialty professional organizations discourage the use of routine cardiac imaging during pre-operative assessment for patients about to undergo low or mid-risk non-cardiac surgery because the procedure carries risks and is unlikely to result in the change of a patient's management. Stress cardiac imaging is discouraged in the evaluation of patients without cardiac symptoms or in routine follow-ups.

Echocardiography

Transthoracic echocardiography uses ultrasonic waves for continuous heart chamber and blood movement visualization. It is the most commonly used imaging tool for diagnosing heart problems, as it allows non-invasive visualization of the heart and the blood flow through the heart, using a technique known as Doppler.

Transesophageal echocardiography uses a specialized probe containing an ultrasound transducer at its tip is passed into the patient's esophagus.  It is used in diagnosis of various thoracic defects or damage, i.e. heart and lung imaging.  It has some advantages and disadvantages over thoracic or intravascular ultrasound.

Magnetic resonance imaging (MRI)

Magnetic resonance imaging visualises the heart by detecting hydrogen atoms using superconducting magnets, particularly those attached to water and fat molecules.  These hydrogen atoms possess a property known as nuclear spin.  Although the direction of this spin is usually random, the spin can be aligned using a powerful magnetic field.  Faint electromagnetic signals are emitted by these hydrogen atoms when their alignment is temporarily disturbed which can be detected and used to create an image of the heart.

MRI is able to measure the size, shape, function, and tissue characteristics of the heart in a single session. It is more reproducible than echocardiography with less inter-observer variability, allowing for more precise reference ranges to better distinguish health from disease. Additional benefits from cardiac MRI include the ability to detect scar within the heart using late gadolinium enhancement, and identify other abnormalities of the heart muscle itself such as infiltration with iron or amyloid protein. Disadvantages of MRI include lengthy protocols and the potential for claustrophobia. Furthermore, an MRI scan cannot be performed in some people who have metallic implants such as some types of pacemakers, defibrillators, although many modern pacemakers are safe for use within an MRI scanner. Other metal structures such as artificial valves and coronary stents are generally not problematic.

Recent development in deep learning and convolutional neural network techniques have made it possible to analyze and quantify some aspects of cardiac MRI automatically. The use of cardiac MRI is projected to increase through greater availability of scanners and more widespread knowledge about its clinical application.

Computed tomography (CT)

Coronary Computed Tomography Angiography (CCTA)

Computed tomography angiography (CTA), an imaging methodology using a ring-shaped machine with an X-ray source spinning around the circular path so as to bathe the inner circle with a uniform and known X-ray density. Cardiology uses are growing with the incredible developments in CT technology.  Currently, multidetector CT, specially the 64 detector-CT are allowing to make cardiac studies in just a few seconds (less than 10 seconds, depending on the equipment and protocol used).  These images are reconstructed using algorithms and software.  Great development and growth will be seen in the short term, allowing radiologists to diagnose cardiac artery disease without anesthesia and in a non-invasive way.

Coronary CT calcium scan
A coronary CT calcium scan is a computed tomography (CT) scan of the heart for the assessment of severity of coronary artery disease. Specifically, it looks for calcium deposits in the coronary arteries that can narrow arteries and increase the risk of heart attack. This severity can be presented as Agatston score or Coronary Artery Calcium (CAC) score. The CAC score is an independent marker of risk for cardiac events, cardiac mortality, and all-cause mortality. In addition, it provides additional prognostic information to other cardiovascular risk markers. A typical coronary CT calcium scan is done without the use of radiocontrast, but it can possibly be done from contrast-enhanced images as well, such as in coronary CT angiography.

Nuclear medicine imaging

Positron emission tomography (PET)
Positron emission tomography (PET), a nuclear medicine imaging methodology for positron emitting radioisotopes. PET enables visual image analysis of multiple different metabolic chemical processes and is thus one of the most flexible imaging technologies. Cardiology uses are growing very slowly due to technical and relative cost difficulties. Most uses are for research, not clinical purposes. Appropriate radioisotopes of elements within chemical compounds of the metabolic pathway being examined are used to make the location of the chemical compounds of interest visible in a PET image.

Single photon emission computed tomography (SPECT)
Single photon emission computed tomography (SPECT), a nuclear medicine imaging methodology using gamma rays emitted by a radioactive tracer injected into the blood stream, which ultimately distributes into the heart. SPECT is most commonly used for myocardial perfusion imaging to detect ischemic heart disease.

Associated invasive cardiac imaging techniques

Coronary catheterization

Coronary catheterization uses pressure monitoring and blood sampling through a catheter inserted into the heart through blood vessels in the leg or wrist to determine the functioning of the heart, and, following injections of radiocontrast dye, uses X-ray fluoroscopy, typically at 30 frames per second, to visualize the position and volume of blood within the heart chambers and arteries. Coronary angiography is used to determine the patency and configuration of the coronary artery lumens.

Intravascular ultrasound

Intravascular ultrasound, also known as a percutaneous echocardiogram is an imaging methodology using specially designed, long, thin, complex manufactured catheters attached to computerized ultrasound equipment to visualize the lumen and the interior wall of blood vessels.

FFR
Fractional flow reserve (FFR) examines the pressure drop across the stenosis in suspected ischemic coronary artery that may require percutaneous coronary intervention (PCI) or coronary artery bypass surgery.

References